The Moray and Nairn Coast is a protected wetland site on the southern shore of the Moray Firth, in the west of Scotland. A total of 2,412 hectares comprises two areas: intertidal flats, saltmarsh and sand dunes at Findhorn Bay and Culbin Bar, and alluvial deposits and woodland of the lower River Spey and Spey Bay. It has been protected as a Ramsar Site since 1997.

Other important birdlife includes ospreys, bar-tailed godwits, pink-footed geese and common redshanks.

As well as the Moray and Nairn Coast being recognised as a wetland of international importance under the Ramsar Convention, it has also been designated a Special Area of Conservation.

References

Ramsar sites in Scotland
Wetlands of Scotland